Rhysolepis is a genus of Mexican plants in the tribe Heliantheae within the family Asteraceae.

 Species
 Rhysolepis kingii H.Rob. - Michoacán
 Rhysolepis morelensis (Greenm.) S.F.Blake - Morelos, Guerrero, México State
 formerly included
About two dozen species now considered more suited to Viguiera.

References

Heliantheae
Asteraceae genera
Endemic flora of Mexico